Great Russian language (Russian: Великорусскій языкъ/Великорусский язык, Velikorusskij jazyk) is a name given in the 19th century to the Russian language as opposed to the other two major East Slavic languages: Belarusian ("White Russian") and Ukrainian ("Little Russian"). For instance, Vladimir Dal's monumental dictionary of the Russian language is titled Explanatory Dictionary of the Living Great Russian Language.

In 19th-century Imperial Russia, many scholars did not distinguish between the East Slavic languages spoken within the borders of the Russian Empire. The East Slavic languages were claimed to be mutually intelligible, a position since called into question.

The Great Russian or just Russian language was formed in the Late Middle Ages in the northern Russian principalities under heavy influence of Church Slavonic. As compared to the Great Russian, other Eastern Slavonic languages were termed one-dimensional because they lacked the stratum of high speech derived from the Church Slavonic. For political reasons, the literary Russian language evolved under the significant influence of the Moscow dialect.

Sources

References

Russian language

ru:Великорусский язык